Zonians (Spanish: Zoneítas, singular: zoneíta, zoniano) are people associated with the Panama Canal Zone, a political entity which existed between 1903 and the absorption of the Canal Zone into the Republic of Panama between 1979 and 1999. Most were American expatriates loyal to the United States. They helped build and maintain the canal. Many Zonians are descendants of the civilian American workers who came to the area during the early 1900s to work and maintain the canal. Many of the Zonians were American citizens born in the Canal Zone or had spent their childhood there. A significant presence of American canal workers remained in the Canal region until its turnover in 1999.

National identity 
Some Zonians consider themselves to be Panamanian and U.S. citizens, although quite a few say that they are only American or only Panamanian. This unique relation—physically near Panama yet citizens of the U.S.—makes Zonians a diasporic community, with members turning to online forums (such as the PANAMA-L listserv) to discuss and debate issues such as nationalism, belonging, and national identity.

The Panama Canal Society holds a reunion for Zonians every year, usually in Orlando, Florida.

Notable Zonians
 John McCain, senior United States senator from Arizona, was the Republican presidential nominee in the 2008 United States election.
 Rod Carew, professional baseball player
 Kenneth Bancroft Clark, noted African-American psychologist
 John G. Claybourn, civil engineer, Dredging Division Superintendent, the original designer of Gamboa, Panama
 Karen Hughes, former U.S. Undersecretary of State for Public Diplomacy and Public Affairs
 Frederick W. Leslie, American astronaut
 Gustavo A. Mellander, Higher education: chancellor, president, and graduate school dean. Authored or co-authored 13 books and over 400 articles on higher education. 
 Richard Prince, painter and photographer
 Charles S. Spencer, curator of Mexican and Central American Archaeology, American Museum of Natural History
 Stephen Stills, noted rock musician
Lou Sola, Commissioner, Federal Maritime Commission.
 Frederik Pohl, science fiction writer and editor
 Sage Steele, anchor ESPN 
 Edward A. Murphy, Jr., aerospace engineer, best known for the eponymous Murphy's law
 Leo Barker, NFL linebacker for Cincinnati Bengals, 1984–1991
 Ernest "Red" Hallen, official photographer of the Panama Canal.
 Shoshana Johnson, US Army soldier taken prisoner during the Battle of Nasiriyah.

References

External links
 Panama Canal Society

 
Panama Canal Zone
Ethnic groups in Panama
Ethnic groups in the United States